The Magic Hour is a 2004 album by Wynton Marsalis, released by Blue Note Records.  The album peaked at number two on Billboard Top Jazz Albums chart. It was recorded on June 6–7, 2003.

Track listing

Personnel 
Wynton Marsalis – trumpet
Eric Lewis – piano
Carlos Henriquez – acoustic bass
Ali Jackson – drums, tambourine
Dianne Reeves – vocalist 
Bobby McFerrin – vocalist

References

2004 albums
Wynton Marsalis albums
Blue Note Records albums